Bruno de Carlo Fuso, born on 30 January 1988 in Limeira, São Paulo (state), Brazil, is a Brazilian soccer player who most recently played for Treze Futebol Clube in 2017.

He previously played in the Brazilian Serie A for Atlético Mineiro and Coritiba, in Serie B for Naútico and Ponte Preta, in the Campeonato Paulista for Ponte Preta and XV de Piracicaba, in the Campeonato Potiguar for ABC Futebol Clube, in the Campeonato Goiano for Novo Hamburgo and on the Campeonato Paraibano for Treze.

Career

Atlético Mineiro
Bruno Fuso began his professional career at Atlético Mineiro, where he had been part of the youth team. He made his league debut in August 2009 in a 1–1 draw against Palmeiras. He went on to play 7 league fixtures in the 2009 season, and made two appearances in the 2009 Copa Sudamericana.

Loan spells
In 2010, he was loaned to Oeste Futebol Clube to play Campeonato Paulista, but only made the substitute bench. For the second half of the year he was loaned to Náutico to play 2010 Campeonato Brasileiro Série B. His debut came as a substitute on 1 June 2010 against São Caetano, a game which ended in a 5–0 defeat. Náutico were already 2–0 when he entered the field, after starting goalkeeper Rodrigo Carvalho was sent off. His first job was to face a penalty taken by Eduardo Pacheco. He went on to make a total of 10 league appearances for the club before the end of the season.

Ponte Preta
He was signed by Ponte Preta for the 2011 campaign, making his debut against Mirassol in a 2–1 2011 Campeonato Paulista defeat. He made 23 appearances in the Campeonato Paulista season, and one in 2011 Copa do Brasil, but only played once when the club competed in 2011 Campeonato Brasileiro Série B in the second half of the year. In the 2012 season he remained out of favour until late in the 2012 Campeonato Paulista campaign, making just four appearances. He also played three 2012 Copa do Brasil games. In the last of these, against São Paulo, he made a bizarre error which cost his side a quarter-final place. Despite being contracted until the end of 2015, he was loaned to Coritiba the following month.

Loan spells
He made just one appearance for Coritiba in 2012 Campeonato Brasileiro Série A, a 3–1 defeat to São Paulo on 8 July 2012, however he signed a pre-contract to return for 2013 Campeonato Brasileiro Série A. He returned to Ponte Preta, and accepted another loan in January 2013 to XV de Piracicaba for 2013 Campeonato Paulista in order to be closer to his family. He made 11 appearances and returned to Ponte Preta on 23 April, and then rejoined Coritiba on 21 May. He made no further appearances for Coritiba in this loan spell.

In 2014 he was loaned on a full-year contract to ABC Futebol Clube. He played all 20 ties for the club in 2014 Campeonato Potiguar, but did not feature in the 2014 Campeonato Brasileiro Série B and returned to Ponte Preta in early November.

He was loaned to Villa Nova-MG for the 2015 season, but made no appearances.

Novo Hamburgo
When his Ponte Preta contract ended, he signed with Novo Hamburgo to play 2016 Campeonato Gaúcho. He made 8 appearances, with his debut being against Ypiranga de Erechim, a 3–1 victory.

Treze
On 7 November 2016, he joined Treze to play 2017 Campeonato Paraibano. His debut came on 7 January 2017 in the first round, with a 1–0 win against Atlético Cajazeirense. He went on to play the first 12 games of the campaign before being dropped to the bench in favour of Diego Martins Machado. Treze went on to be runners up in the competition.

Sergipe
After the end of the campaign with Treze, he signed for Sergipe side Club Sportivo Sergipe to play 2017 Campeonato Brasileiro Série D. He made his debut in the first game of the competitions, a 2-1 defeat to Jacobina Esporte Clube.

External links

References

1988 births
Living people
Brazilian footballers
Association football goalkeepers
Campeonato Brasileiro Série A players
Campeonato Brasileiro Série B players
Campeonato Brasileiro Série C players
Campeonato Brasileiro Série D players
Clube Atlético Mineiro players
Oeste Futebol Clube players
Clube Náutico Capibaribe players
Associação Atlética Ponte Preta players
Coritiba Foot Ball Club players
Esporte Clube XV de Novembro (Piracicaba) players
ABC Futebol Clube players
Villa Nova Atlético Clube players
Esporte Clube Novo Hamburgo players
Treze Futebol Clube players
Brasiliense Futebol Clube players
Club Sportivo Sergipe players
Footballers from São Paulo (state)